Riig Oomane is a town in the north-central Mudug region of Somalia. It is situated between Galdogob and Galkayo, the provincial capital.

References
Rigoomane, Mudug, Somalia

Populated places in Mudug